The Kansas City Royals baseball team is currently owned by an ownership group led by John Sherman. The franchise was first established by Ewing Kauffman in 1967.

Owners
Ewing Kauffman (1967—1993)
Avron Fogelman (1983—1991, part owner)
Ewing Kauffman estate (1993—2000)
David Glass (2000—2019)
John Sherman (2020—present, majority owner)
Alan Atterbury
Dan Dees
Mark Demetree
The Dunn Family
Paul Edgerly
Bill Gautreaux
Mike Haverty
J. B. Hebenstreit
Carl Hughes
Rob Kaplan
Mariner Kemper
The Lockton Family
Patrick Mahomes
Peter and Veronica Mallouk
Terry Matlack
Kent McCarthy
Jay Pack
PJM Baseball, LLC
PlayBallKC, LLC
Seventh Inning Stretch, LLC
Brooks Sherman
Eric Stonestreet
Don Wagner

General Managers
Cedric Tallis (1968—1974)
Joe Burke (1974—1981)
John Schuerholz  (1981—1990)
Herk Robinson (1990—2000)
Allard Baird  (2000—2006) 
Dayton Moore  (2007—2021)
J. J. Picollo (2022—present)

Other executives
Larry Doughty
Dan Glass
Lou Gorman
Michael E. Herman
Joe Klein
Art Stewart
Dean Taylor

References

External links
Baseball America: Executive Database

 
 
Kansas City
Owners and executives